Cry of the Werewolf is a 1944 American horror film directed by Henry Levin and starring Nina Foch, Stephen Crane, Osa Massen, Blanche Yurka and Barton MacLane.

Plot
A Romani princess descended from Marie LaTour has the ability to change into a wolf at will, just like her late mother. When she learns that Marie LaTour's tomb has been discovered, she decides to use her talent to kill everyone who knows the location, because it is a sacred secret that only her people are allowed to know.

Cast
 Nina Foch as Princess Celeste LaTour
 Stephen Crane as Robert 'Bob' Morris
 Osa Massen as Elsa Chauvet
 Blanche Yurka as Bianca
 Barton MacLane as Police Lt. Barry Lane

Production
The film was developed with the working title of Bride of the Vampire.

Release
Cry of the Werewolf premiered in New York on August 17, 1944. Cry of the Werewolf was issued theatrically as a double feature with The Soul of a Monster and continued to receive theatrical re-releases into the early 1950s.

Reception
Michael R. Pitts described the film's reception as "mixed" on its initial release. The New York Times stated that "[T]here is absolutely nothing original in this utterly suspenseless film" while a reviewer in Sunday-Times Signal proclaimed that "Horror fans are in for a thrill [with] the story of dread voodoo murders, horrifying tribal rites and a fantastic feast of death in which lovely and talented Nina Foch plays the woman werewolf whose mother terrorized millions and because of whose sins Nina can never marry."

in 1962, Joe Dante included the film in his list of worst horror films list in Famous Monsters. Dante stated the film was "a pretty dismal hunk of nonsense. Tho Nina Foch as the werewoman killed people left & right it was still a bore."

See also
 List of American films of 1944

References

Sources

External links
 
 
 

1944 horror films
1944 films
American werewolf films
Films directed by Henry Levin
Columbia Pictures films
American black-and-white films
American supernatural horror films
1944 directorial debut films
1940s English-language films
1940s American films